Alfred Schindler may refer to:

 Alfred Schindler (industrialist) (1894–1987), American industrialist
 Alfred Schindler (skier) (born 1957), Swiss cross-country skier